Merle Homeier (born 27 August 1999) is a German track and field athlete who competes as a long jumper.

Early life
Homeier studied biology at Leibniz University Hannover. In 2018 she became the German U20 long jump champion indoors and was runner up to Lea-Jasmine Riecke at the U20 German outdoor championships.

Career
Homeier came second at the 2021 European Athletics U23 Championships jumping a personal best 6.69m to finish behind Hungarian Petra Farkas. In Leipzig, in February 2022, Homeier finished runner up at the German indoor championships to Olympic champion Malaika Mihambo.

In Eugene, Oregon in July 2022 Homeier competed in the 2020 World Athletics Championships but failed to finish in the qualifying positions for the final. Competing in difficult wind conditions she didn't improve on a jump of 6.09 metres. In August 2022 Homeier qualified for the final with a 6.49m jump at the 2022 European Championships long jump competition in Munich, and in the final finished ninth overall.

References

External links

1999 births
Living people
German female long jumpers
German female athletes
World Athletics Championships athletes for Germany
University of Hanover alumni
People from Bückeburg
Sportspeople from Lower Saxony